Bidan (also Romanized as Bīdān; also known as Bābbīdān and Bīdūn) is a village in Sarbanan Rural District, in the Central District of Zarand County, Kerman Province, Iran. At the 2006 census, its population was 24, in 6 families.

References 

Populated places in Zarand County